B roads are numbered routes in Great Britain of lesser importance than A roads. See the article Great Britain road numbering scheme for the rationale behind the numbers allocated.

Zone 9 (3 digits)

Zone 9 (4 digits)

References

See also
 A roads in Zone 9 of the Great Britain numbering scheme
 List of motorways in the United Kingdom
 Transport in Aberdeen#Roads
 Transport in Edinburgh#Road network
 Transport in Scotland#Road

9